Youssef Hmimssa is a citizen of Morocco, who was convicted in a Detroit, Michigan court of fraud and who was a key witness in the case against the Detroit Sleeper Cell.

Biography
Hmimssa left Morocco in 1990, when he was 18.  He spent the next four years in Europe, using false identity papers under the name Patrick Vuillame.

In 1994 he arrived in the United States.  Hmimssa claims that other than living under a false identity he wasn't breaking any laws.  He drove a cab, in Chicago, Illinois while he attended Northeastern University.  In 1999 he received a bachelor's degree in Computer Science and Microsoft certified system engineer certificate.

Hmimssa says he was cheated of two months pay at his last computer job.  He said the firm purposely hired illegal immigrants, knowing it could cheat them of their pay, without repercussions.  He claimed this drove him to a life of crime.

Hmimssa returned to driving a cab, and acquired a clandestine credit card reader, and stole the information necessary to duplicate hundreds of credit cards from his cab fares.

In 2001 he moved to Detroit, where he met the men he testified against in the sleeper cell case.  Richard Convertino characterized the defendants as "Takfiris" -- Jihadists so radical they would refrain from praying, and drink alcohol, so they could pass as westernised, secular Muslims, in order to plan clandestine terrorist attacks.

But the case unraveled on Hmimssa's testimony.

Alleged role in the aftermath of 9/11

Immediately after the September 11 attacks, news organizations across America portrayed Youssef Hmimssa as "The Most Wanted Man in the United States" and the key to a Terrorist Sleeper cell in Detroit.

The main error in this news was that Youssef Hmimssa was already federally incarcerated in Milan, Michigan, both before and during the 9-11 attacks. When his face flashed across American televisions just after the 9/11 attacks, prison guards at Milan, Michigan, were alerted to his whereabouts. When the other prisoners were intimidated into silence concerning Hmimssa, a telephone call was then made to Barbera Ann Wood, a former U.S. Customs officer and mother of one of the inmates. She was asked to notify the F.B.I. directly, because the B.O.P. and Federal officers at Milan were uncooperative in bringing this information forward. The day after the F.B.I. was notified of his location in Cedar Rapids, Iowa, news went out that Hmimssa was located, apprehended, and "transferred" directly to Milan, Michigan.

Federal B.O.P. records show that  Hmimssa was reported at Milan even though Public Information concerning this alleged criminal portrays a different set of circumstances. There are reports that Youssef Hmimssa may be actually a CIA agent and he had never spend a single day in prison. After his release he simply disappeared without a trace although there are reports that he is living under different name somewhere in Europe.

Other aliases
Patrick J. Vuillaume
Michael Saisa
Jalali
Diamond Vassiafa
Colon Edgardo
Calaude Cesar Medina

References

  Cell phony: Government's star witness says he's a scam artist, not a terrorist, Detroit Metro Times, April 16, 2003
  USA v. Karim Kobrouti et al., Findlaw
  Detroit 'Sleeper Cell' Prosecutor Faces Probe: Grand Jury Considering Indictment for Misconduct, Washington Post, November 4, 2005
  Remember This?, Cedar Rapids Gazette, September 11, 2011

Year of birth missing (living people)
Living people
People convicted of fraud
American Muslims
Moroccan emigrants to the United States